Vitelline circulation refers to the system of blood flowing from the embryo to the yolk sac and back again.

The yolk-sac is situated on the ventral aspect of the embryo; it is lined by endoderm, outside of which is a layer of mesoderm. It is filled with fluid, the vitelline fluid, which is utilized for the nourishment of the embryo during the earlier stages of its existence. Blood is conveyed to the wall of the sac by the vitelline arteries (a branch of the dorsal aorta), and after circulating through a wide-meshed capillary plexus, is returned by the vitelline veins to the tubular heart of the embryo. This constitutes the vitelline circulation, and by means of it nutritive material is absorbed from the yolk-sac and conveyed to the embryo.

References

External links
 
 Overview of three circulation systems

Embryology of cardiovascular system